TNF receptor-associated factor 2 is a protein that in humans is encoded by the TRAF2 gene.

Function 

The protein encoded by this gene is a member of the TNF receptor associated factor (TRAF) protein family. TRAF proteins associate with, and mediate the signal transduction from members of the TNF receptor superfamily. This protein directly interacts with TNF receptors, and forms complexes with other TRAF proteins. TRAF2 is required for TNF-alpha-mediated activation of MAPK8/JNK and NF-κB. The protein complex formed by TRAF2 and TRAF1 interacts with the IAP family members cIAP1 and cIAP2, and functions as a mediator of the anti-apoptotic signals from TNF receptors. The interaction of this protein with TRADD, a TNF receptor associated apoptotic signal transducer, ensures the recruitment of IAPs for the direct inhibition of caspase activation. cIAP1 can ubiquitinate and induce the degradation of this protein, and thus potentiate TNF-induced apoptosis. Multiple alternatively spliced transcript variants have been found for this gene, but the biological validity of only one transcript has been determined.

Interactions 
TRAF2 has been shown to interact with:

 ASK1, 
 BCL10, 
 BIRC2, 
 Baculoviral IAP repeat-containing protein 3, 
 CASP8AP2, 
 CD134, 
 CD137, 
 CD27, 
 CD40, 
 CFLAR, 
 CHUK, 
 Caveolin 1, 
 EDARADD, 
 HIVEP3, 
 IKK2, 
 Low affinity nerve growth factor receptor, 
 MAP3K14, 
 MAP3K1, 
 MAP3K7IP2, 
 MAP4K2, 
 MAP4K5, 
 RANK, 
 RIPK1, 
 SPHK1, 
 TANK, 
 TANK-binding kinase 1, 
 TNFAIP3, 
 TNFRSF13B, 
 TNFRSF14, 
 TNFRSF1A, 
 TNFRSF1B, 
 TNFSF14, 
 TRADD, 
 TRAF interacting protein,
 TRAF1,  and
 UBE2N.

Model organisms
Model organisms have been used in the study of TRAF2 function. A conditional knockout mouse line called Traf2tm1a(EUCOMM)Wtsi was generated at the Wellcome Trust Sanger Institute. Male and female animals underwent a standardized phenotypic screen to determine the effects of deletion. Additional screens performed:  - In-depth immunological phenotyping

References

Further reading